The Bentley Falcons men's ice hockey team is a National Collegiate Athletic Association (NCAA) Division I college ice hockey program that represents Bentley University in Waltham, Massachusetts. The Falcons are an original member of Atlantic Hockey, The Falcons play their home games at the Bentley Arena on the school's campus in Waltham, Massachusetts, having moved into the new, on-campus arena in February 2018.  The Falcons are coached by former Falcon forward Ryan Soderquist ('00), the program's all-time scoring leader.

History
Hockey at Bentley began as a modest club team organized by students in the mid-1960s. Bentley Hall of Famer Reg Pearless was the first captain. The team gained official varsity status beginning with the 1977–78 season, and claimed consecutive ECAC 3 championships in 1980 and 1981.

The program made a provisional move to Division I for the 1998–99 season, and became a full Division I member for the following season, being a member of the MAAC. The Falcons then became one of the founding members of Atlantic Hockey when the league was founded for the 2003–04 season.

The team played its home games at the John A. Ryan Arena in Watertown from 1977 to 2018, before they moved into their new, on-campus home, Bentley Arena in February 2018.

Season-by-season results

All-time coaching records
As of the completion of 2022–23 season

Statistical leaders

Career points leaders

Career goaltending leaders

GP = Games played; Min = Minutes played; W = Wins; L = Losses; T = Ties; GA = Goals against; SO = Shutouts; SV% = Save percentage; GAA = Goals against average

Minimum 40 games

Statistics current through the start of the 2020–21 season.

Roster
As of June 30, 2022.

|}

Uniform

The Falcons have undergone a couple of uniform changes since the start of the 2010–2011 season.  In accordance with the new Bentley brand, the Falcon's moved away from the white, navy and gold color scheme.  The first switch made was to their road uniform.  They moved from navy blue, with gold "Bentley" lettering, and white trim to a black uniform with a navy blue B in the middle and white trim.  The new home uniforms were unveiled in the 2013–2014 season, and are still their current home uniforms.  They are white with the Bentley back and grey B in the middle, navy blue and black trim, and black numbers/names on jerseys on the back.  The new home jerseys were unveiled at Frozen Fenway on 12/28/2014.  To start the 2014–2015 season, the Falcon's unveiled another new road uniform.  This, their current road jersey, is black with navy blue "Bentley" lettering across the front, using white and navy trim with the Bentley crest on the shoulder. Both uniforms use black helmets, and black pants with a navy blue and white trim.

Home arena

The Falcons play at Bentley Arena, the program's new, on-campus arena. Ground was broken on the new arena in the summer of 2016, and completed in February 2018. The Falcons played their first game in the new Arena on February 16, against Army West Point.

The 76,000 square foot Bentley Arena was designed by Architectural Resources Cambridge and built by Suffolk Construction. It has a capacity of 2,207 for hockey games.

Notable alumni

 Ryan Soderquist (2000): Soderquist graduated in 2000 with the most career goals (84) and career points (173) in program history. Soderquist also holds the record for most goals in a season, with 33. He has been Bentley's head coach since 2002, leading the team to a 243–300–78 record.
 Brett Gensler (2014): Gensler graduated in 2014 as the program's all-time points leader at the Division I level, behind only Coach Ryan Soderquist.  He was responsible for two of the three 50-point seasons in Bentley history, Gensler earned first-team All-Atlantic Hockey honors each of his last three years and was the recipient of the 2012 Walter Brown Award as the top American-born player in New England. He concluded his career with 73 goals (a Bentley Division I record), a school-record 94 assists and 167 points, second most in program history. After completing his Bentley career, Gensler signed with the South Carolina Stingrays of the ECHL.
 Max French (2017): French graduated in 2017, finishing his career as the Falcons' all-time 5th best point scorer and 4th best goal scorer. French was an assistant captain to Andrew Gladiuk in 2015-2016 as a junior and was named captain of the Falcons in his final season. French also earned All-Atlantic Hockey First Team honors in both his junior and senior seasons. During his time at Bentley, French racked up 143 points (67 goals, 76 assists) in 138 career games to join Gensler and Gladiuk as the only Falcons to average over a point per game at the Division I level. Upon completion of his senior season, French was invited to an ATO with the Utica Comets of the AHL, but never found the starting lineup in his short few weeks with the team. On July 12, 2017, the Texas Stars, AHL affiliate of the NHL's Dallas Stars, signed French for the 2017–2018 season. This signing marked the first time a Bentley alum had been signed to a professional contract at the AHL level or above.
Tanner Jago (2019): Jago finished his Bentley career with the second-most games played in program history, as well as third-most points for a defenseman in program history. In July 2019, he signed with the Texas Stars of the AHL. 
Alexey Solovyev (2019): Solovyev signed with the Providence Bruins of the AHL in July 2019.

References

External links

 
Ice hockey teams in Massachusetts